In fluid dynamics, Couette flow is the flow of a viscous fluid in the space between two surfaces, one of which is moving tangentially relative to the other. The relative motion of the surfaces imposes a shear stress on the fluid and induces flow. Depending on the definition of the term, there may also be an applied pressure gradient in the flow direction. 

The Couette configuration models certain practical problems, like the Earth's mantle and atmosphere, and flow in lightly loaded journal bearings. It is also employed in viscometry and to demonstrate approximations of reversibility. 

It is named after Maurice Couette, a Professor of Physics at the French University of Angers in the late 19th century.

Planar Couette flow 

Couette flow is frequently used in undergraduate physics and engineering courses to illustrate shear-driven fluid motion. A simple configuration corresponds to two infinite, parallel plates separated by a distance ; one plate translates with a constant relative velocity  in its own plane. Neglecting pressure gradients, the Navier–Stokes equations simplify to

This equation reflects the assumption that the flow is unidirectional — that is, only one of the three velocity components  is non-trivial. The exact solution

can be found by integrating twice and solving for the constants using the boundary conditions.
A notable aspect of the flow is that shear stress is constant throughout the domain. In particular, the first derivative of the velocity, is constant. According to Newton's Law of Viscosity (Newtonian fluid), the shear stress is the product of this expression and the (constant) fluid viscosity.

Startup

In reality, the Couette solution is not reached instantaneously. The "startup problem" describing the approach to steady state is given by

subject to the initial condition

and with the same boundary conditions as the steady flow:

The problem can be made homogeneous by subtracting the steady solution. Then, applying separation of variables leads to the solution:

.

Planar flow with pressure gradient 
A more general Couette flow includes a constant pressure gradient  in a direction parallel to the plates. The Navier–Stokes equations are

where  is the dynamic viscosity. Integrating the above equation twice and applying the boundary conditions (same as in the case of Couette flow without pressure gradient) gives

The pressure gradient can be positive (adverse pressure gradient) or negative (favorable pressure gradient). In the limiting case of stationary plates, the flow is referred to as Plane Poiseuille flow, and has a symmetric (with reference to the horizontal mid-plane) parabolic velocity profile.

Compressible flow

In incompressible flow, the velocity profile is linear because the fluid temperature is constant. When the upper and lower walls are maintained at different temperatures, the velocity profile is more complicated. However, it has an exact implicit solution as shown by C. R. Illingworth in 1950.

Consider the plane Couette flow with lower wall at rest and the upper wall in motion with constant velocity . Denote fluid properties at the lower wall with subscript  and properties at the upper wall with subscript . The properties and the pressure at the upper wall are prescribed and taken as reference quantities. Let  be the distance between the two walls. The boundary conditions are

Conservation of mass and -momentum requires  everywhere in the flow domain. Conservation of energy and -momentum reduce to

where  is the wall shear stress. Introduce the non-dimensional variables

In terms of these quantities, the solutions are

where  is the heat transferred per unit time per unit area from the lower wall. Then the solution is

If the specific heat is constant, then . While there is no simple expression for  that is both accurate and general, there are several approximations for certain materials — see, e.g., temperature dependence of viscosity. For air, the values  are commonly used, and the results for this case are shown in the figure.

The effects of dissociation and ionization (i.e.,  is not constant) have also been studied; in that case the recovery temperature is reduced by the dissociation of molecules.

Rectangular channel 

One-dimensional flow  is valid when both plates are infinitely long in the streamwise and spanwise directions. However, the infinite length in the streamwise direction must be retained in order to ensure the unidirectional nature of the flow.

As an example, consider an infinitely long rectangular channel with transverse height  and spanwise width , subject to the condition that the top wall moves with a constant velocity . Without an imposed pressure gradient, the Navier–Stokes equations reduce to

with boundary conditions

Using separation of variables, the solution is given by

When , the planar Couette flow is recovered, as shown in the figure.

Coaxial cylinders 
Taylor–Couette flow is a flow between two rotating, infinitely long, coaxial cylinders. The original problem was solved by Stokes in 1845, but Geoffrey Ingram Taylor's name was attached to the flow because he studied its stability in a famous 1923 paper.

The problem can be solved in cylindrical coordinates .

This equation shows that the effects of curvature no longer allow for constant shear in the flow domain.

Coaxial cylinders of finite length
The classical Taylor–Couette flow problem assumes infinitely long cylinders; if the cylinders have non-negligible finite length , then the analysis must be modified (though the flow is still unidirectional). For , the finite-length problem can be solved using separation of variables or integral transforms, giving:

where  are the Modified Bessel functions of the first and second kind.

See also 
 Laminar flow
 Stokes-Couette flow
Hagen–Poiseuille equation
 Taylor–Couette flow
Hagen–Poiseuille flow from the Navier–Stokes equations

References

Sources 

 
 
 
 
 
 
 
 
 Liepmann, H. W., and Z. O. Bleviss. "The effects of dissociation and ionization on compressible couette flow." Douglas Aircraft Co. Rept. SM-19831 130 (1956).
 Liepmann, Hans Wolfgang, and Anatol Roshko. Elements of gasdynamics. Courier Corporation, 1957.
 
 Richard Feynman (1964) The Feynman Lectures on Physics: Mainly Electromagnetism and Matter, § 41–6 Couette flow, Addison–Wesley

External links
 AMS Glossary: Couette Flow
 A rheologists perspective: the science behind the couette cell accessory

Flow regimes
Fluid dynamics